Patriarch Mark II may refer to:

 Mark II of Alexandria, Pope of Alexandria in 141–152
 Mark II of Constantinople, Ecumenical Patriarch in 1465–1466